Bird Nest Roys is an album by New Zealand band Bird Nest Roys released in 1987.

Track listing
Side A
Five Weet-bix And Toast - 02:20
Alien - 03:52
Loving Time - 02:19
Jaffa Boy - 03:05
Bided - 01:45
Side B
Joringel - 03:18
Me Want Me Get Me Need Me Have Me Love - 03:14
Michael Jones - 02:45
Who Is The Silliest Rossi? - 02:07
Love - 03:01
Wads Of Pork Fat - 01:25

Personnel
Deberly Roy (bass)
Peter Moerenhout (drums)
Dominic Stones (guitar)
Big Ross (guitar, vocals)
Warro Wakefield (tambourine, backing vocals)
Little Ross (vocals)

References

Bird Nest Roys albums
Flying Nun Records albums
1987 albums